The Original Recordings (Singles and Unreleased 1994-1997) is a compilation album put together by founding members of The Detroit Cobras, and their fifth release. The album includes the original line up’s earliest recordings, made in 1994, 1995, 1996, out takes from their first LP (1997)and other unreleased tracks.

This album was going to be released by Sympathy for the Record Industry as Lost and Found in 2004, but complications arose with the current and former members of the band, so the project was temporarily scrapped.  Munster Records in Spain was successful in reaching an agreement with all parties involved and released the LP in three different formats, 12" LP, CD and 7" 45 boxset, each including a detailed history of the early years and formation of the group.

Track listing

Village of Love
   (recorded 1994)
Original by Nathaniel Mayer
Maria Christina
   (recorded 1995)
Original by Tony Valla And The Alamos
Over To My House
   (recorded 1994)
Original by Geeshie Wiley & Elvie Thomas
Sad Affair
   (recorded 1994)
Original by Lee Rodgers
Down in Louisiana
   (recorded 1995)
Original by Polka Dot Slim
Ain't It a Shame
   (recorded 1994)
Original by Question Mark and the Mysterians
Slum Lord
   (Recorded 1996)
Original by The Deviants
It's Raining
   (Recorded 1994)
Original by Irma Thomas
Cha Cha Twist
   (Recorded 1997)
Funnel of Love
   (Recorded 1996)
Original by Wanda Jackson
I've Got A Feeling
   (Recorded 1997)
Original by Baby Washington
Time Changes Things
   (Recorded 1997)
Original by The Supremes
Brainwashed
   (Recorded 1997)
Original by The Kinks
Curly Haired Baby
   (Recorded 1995)
Original by Roy Byrd
Cobras covered the Professor Longhair version 

With Body and Soul
   (Recorded 1995)
Original by Bill Monroe

Personnel
Rachel Nagy	 - 	Lead Vocals/Piano
Maribel (Mary) Restrepo	 - 	Guitar
Steve Shaw     -    Guitar/Vocals
Jeff Meier    -   Bass Guitar/Vocals
Victor Hill   -  Drums
Chris Fachini   -  Drums
Damian Lang   -    Drums
 Jim Shaw (as Shakey James) - Tambourine on “Maria Christina “

References

The Detroit Cobras albums
2008 compilation albums